Aboriginal Science Fiction was a high-circulation semi-professional science fiction magazine started in October 1986 by editor Charles Ryan. After releasing 49 issues it ceased publication in the spring of 2001. In 2002 the rights to Aboriginal Science Fiction were acquired by Absolute Magnitude.

Origins of the name
In an interview Charles Ryan explained his choice of name as follows:

Anthology
In 1988 Absolute Entertainment, Inc. released an 80-page anthology called Aboriginal Science Fiction 1988 Annual Anthology which contained twelve stories from earlier issues of the magazine.

Publishers
The magazine was published out of Woburn, Massachusetts by
 Aboriginal SF, October 1986 - May 1987
 Absolute Entertainment, Inc., July 1987 - July 1991
 The Second Renaissance Foundation, December 1991 - 2001

Illustrators
Among the many illustrators for this magazine was filmmaker Larry Blamire.

See also
 List of defunct American periodicals

References

Defunct science fiction magazines published in the United States
Magazines established in 1986
Magazines disestablished in 2001
Magazines published in Massachusetts
Science fiction magazines established in the 1980s